Douglas A. Mendini (1953–2016) was an author who wrote under the pseudonym Julian Biddle, known for "What Was Hot", a history of pop culture in America, among other books.  The name was a pseudonym for writer Douglas A. Mendini (1953–2016).  Writing as Mendini, his non-fiction appeared in Life, Entertainment Weekly, and Country Living magazines, among others. He was also the playwright of “A Good Sport”, “Overeating Causes Death” and other plays.  His fiction appeared in over 30 journals.

External links
Douglas Mendini Obituary - Lake Ariel, PA | Asbury Park Press

References 

 Biddle, Julian (2001). What Was Hot!: Five Decades of Pop Culture in America. New York: Citadel, p. ix. 

1953 births
2016 deaths
Writers from New Brunswick, New Jersey
Cultural historians
20th-century American dramatists and playwrights